Jana Dukátová (born 13 June 1983) is a Slovak retired slalom canoeist who competed at the international level from 1999 to 2021.

She won nine medals at the ICF Canoe Slalom World Championships with three golds (C1: 2010; K1: 2006; K1 team: 2011), four silvers (K1: 2010, 2011, 2017; K1 team: 2009) and two bronzes (K1 team: 2014, 2021).

She won the overall World Cup title four times in the K1 class (2009, 2010, 2011 and 2013). At the European Championships she won a total of 14 medals (4 golds, 5 silvers and 5 bronzes).

Dukátová qualified for the 2012 Summer Olympics in London after defeating double Olympic Champion Elena Kaliská in the Slovak selection process, four years after having lost to Kaliská in the selection trials for the 2008 Olympics. She finished in 6th place in the K1 event in London. She finished in 4th place in the same event at the 2016 Summer Olympics in Rio de Janeiro.

She retired from the sport after the 2021 World Championships on her home course in Bratislava.

World Cup individual podiums

1 World Championship counting for World Cup points
2 Oceania Championship counting for World Cup points
3 Oceania Canoe Slalom Open counting for World Cup points

Personal life
Her life partner is her longtime coach Róbert Orokocký with whom she has a daughter Lívia. She took a break from the sport in 2018 due to pregnancy and motherhood.

References

 
 2010 ICF Canoe Slalom World Championships 11 September 2010 K1 women's final results. – Retrieved 11 September 2010.
 12 September 2009 results of the women's K1 team finals at the 2009 ICF Canoe Slalom World Championships. – Retrieved 12 September 2009.

External links
 
 
 
 

1983 births
Living people
Sportspeople from Bratislava
Slovak female canoeists
Canoeists at the 2012 Summer Olympics
Canoeists at the 2016 Summer Olympics
Olympic canoeists of Slovakia
Medalists at the ICF Canoe Slalom World Championships